Joshua "Josh" Barrow is an American multi-sport athlete.

Career athletic highlights include:
 NCAA Football Wide Receiver, Lacrosse Midfielder, Squash Singles, 1997–1999
 San Diego Rock'n'Roll Marathon finisher, 2002
 Red Hills Triathlon fourth place division, 2004
 NFL Scout Combine, 2004
 Sunshine State Games Racquetball champion, 2005
 Minor League Hockey Defenseman, 2006
 Squak Mountain 10K Trail Run second place overall, 2008
 Fitness for Vitality 10K individual race overall champion, 2008
 US Bobsled America’s Cup sixth place, 2009
 Mercer Island Kayak Race first place division, 2009
 BEAST Adventure Race Series #2 first place division, 2010
 Vineman Full Iron Distance Triathlon finisher, 2010
 National Guard Biathlon Championships participant, 2011
 Magnuson Run Series 10K overall champion, 2011
 Masters National US Sprint Kayak Championship Team, 2012
 Summer National Biathlon Championships Sprint Race Masters first place, 2015

Barrow is a certified personal trainer through AFPA and has received athlete benefits from Gold's Gym, Hammer Nutrition, Gu, and Rossignol ski gear.

References

External links
 https://www.runrocknroll.com/Events/San-Diego
 http://www.redhillstri.com/
 https://web.archive.org/web/20110903124010/http://www.combines.com/home/
 https://sunshinestategames.com/
 https://web.archive.org/web/20120424230823/http://www.sunvalleysuns.com/history.asp?SID=12&ID=RecordsJ-2
 Black Diamond Hockey League
 https://web.archive.org/web/20111004113042/http://nwtrailruns.com/20061210sqm-results.asp
 http://www.fitnessforvitality.com/5k10k-races/race-results/
 
 https://web.archive.org/web/20110925020126/http://soundrowers.org/RaceResults.aspx
 https://web.archive.org/web/20110905033126/http://www.beastrace.com/b-results.asp
 https://web.archive.org/web/20110904073655/http://www.vineman.com/triathlon/results_race02.htm
 https://web.archive.org/web/20110716122206/http://www.esnsa.org/biathlon2011cover.htm
 https://web.archive.org/web/20120424230835/http://magnusonseries.org/resultsArchives/march_2011.pdf
 http://sckclub.org/sckc/NAT2012/index.html
 http://www.eabiathlon.org/results.html

Living people
American male bobsledders
American male biathletes
Year of birth missing (living people)